Londres is a former commune of France, located in the Lot-et-Garonne department.

It was annexed to Puymiclan in 1839.

References

Former communes of Lot-et-Garonne